Hannahatchee Creek is a stream in the U.S. state of Georgia. It is a tributary to the Chattahoochee River.

Hannahatchee is a word derived from the Muscogee language meaning "cedar creek".

References

Rivers of Georgia (U.S. state)
Rivers of Stewart County, Georgia